The RPK-1 Vikhr  NATO reporting name  SUW-N-1 ( - meaning Whirlwind) was a Soviet nuclear anti submarine missile system. FRAS-1 was the NATO code for the missile round itself.

The development of the missile was ordered in 1960 in order to combat the new American nuclear submarines. The requirement was for an all weather weapon capable of reaching out to 20 km at speed. The first test was in 1964 and the system was installed on the Moskva class helicopter cruisers in 1967. The system was also installed on the Kiev class aircraft carriers. The systems were decommissioned in the 1990s.

Launchers
There were two models of launcher:
 MS-18 used in the Moskva class - a two arm launcher with a rotary magazine holding 8 missiles
 MS-32 used in the Kiev class - a two arm launcher with two rotary magazines holding 16 missiles

A prototype launcher was mounted on the Petya class frigate SKR-1 for testing in 1964

Missile
The missile was a two-stage rocket with inertial guidance, which could not be corrected after launch. The missile carried a nuclear depth bomb warhead of up to 10 kilotons in yield. The warhead could detonate at a depth of up to 200 m and had a lethal radius of 1.2 to 1.5 km against a submarine target.

Fire Control
The ships fitted with the RPK-1 had the Sprut fire control system (PUSTB-1123), which was developed by CDB-209 [2] and included:
 A central control unit, (TSPUS)
 The Tiphon fire control computer
 Gyro stabilisers
 Link to the sonar system
 Remote power control of the launcher

See also
 RUR-5 ASROC- American equivalent

References

 This page is translated from the Russian Language Wikipedia

External links
 - Page in Russian Language from Encyclopedia of Ships
 - Page in Russian Language from Military Russia
 - Page in Russian language from Black Sea Fleet

Naval weapons of the Cold War
Anti-submarine missiles
Cold War missiles of the Soviet Union